The Rare Diseases Clinical Research Network (RDCRN) is an initiative of the Office of Rare Diseases Research (ORDR). RDCRN is funded by the ORDR, the National Center for Advancing Translational Sciences and collaborating institute centers. The RDCRN is designed to advance medical research on rare diseases by providing support for clinical studies and facilitating collaboration, study enrollment and data sharing. Through the RDCRN consortia, physician scientists and their multidisciplinary teams work together with patient advocacy groups to study more than 200 rare diseases at sites across the nation.

Established by Congress under the Rare Diseases Act in 2002, the RDCRN has included more than 350 sites in the United States and more than 50 in 22 other countries. To date, they have encompassed 237 research protocols and included more than 56,000 participants in studies ranging from immune system disorders and rare cancers to heart and lung disorders, brain development diseases and more.

History 
The following is a timeline of the Rare Diseases Clinical Research Network:
 As a result of the Rare Diseases Act of 2002, on February 27, 2003, the ORDR (in conjunction with the National Center for Research Resources (NCRR), the General Clinical Research Consortium (GCRC) Program, and other NIH Institutes) requested applications for a Rare Diseases Clinical Research Network.
 On November 3, 2003, the NIH established the Rare Diseases Clinical Research Network with a Data Technology Coordinating Center and the first Rare Disease Clinical Research Consortia (RDCRCs). The founding members of the RDCRN were:
 Rare Disease Clinical Research Center for New Therapies and New Diagnostics, Principal Investigator:  Dr. Arthur L. Beaudet (Baylor College of Medicine, Houston, TX)
 Vasculitis Clinical Research Network, Principal Investigator: Dr. Peter A. Merkel (University Pennsylvania, Philadelphia, PA)
 Rare Lung Diseases Consortium, Principal Investigator: Dr. Bruce C. Trapnell (Children's Hospital Medical Center, Cincinnati, OH)
 Rare Diseases Clinical Research Center for Urea Cycle Disorders, Principal Investigator: Dr. Mark L. Batshaw (Children's National Medical Center, Washington, DC)
 Bone Marrow Failure Clinical Research Center, Principal Investigator: Dr. Jaroslaw P. Maciejewski (The Cleveland Clinic Foundation, Cleveland, OH)
 Nervous System Channelopathies Pathogenesis and Treatment, Principal Investigator: Dr. Robert C. Griggs (University of Rochester, Rochester, NY)
 The Natural History of Rare Genetic Steroid Disorders, Principal Investigator: Dr. Maria New (Weill Medical College of Cornell University, New York, NY)
 The Data and Technology Coordinating Center, Principal Investigator: Dr. Jeffrey P. Krischer (H. Lee Moffitt Cancer Center and Research Institute, University of South Florida, Tampa, FL)
 On February 8, 2009, the ORDR partnered with 10 other NIH Institutes to release two requests for resubmissions for the RDCRN.
 On October 5, 2009, the NIH announced funding for 19 rare disease clinical research consortia and a Data Management Coordinating Center through the ORDR, along with the National Institute of Neurological Disorders and Stroke (NINDS), the Eunice Kennedy Shriver National Institute of Child Health and Human Development (NICHD), the National Heart, Lung, and Blood Institute (NHLBI), the National Institute of Diabetes and Digestive and Kidney Diseases (NIDDK), the National Institute of Allergy and Infectious Diseases (NIAID), the National Institute of Dental and Craniofacial Research (NIDCR), and the National Institute of Arthritis and Musculoskeletal and Skin Diseases (NIAMS).
On October 8, 2014, the NIH announced additional funding of $29 million.
On October 3, 2019, the NIH announced funding of $38 million for 20 rare diseases clinical research consortia and a new Data Management and Coordinating Center through the National Center for Advancing Translational Science's Office of Rare Diseases Research, along with the National Institute of Allergy and Infectious Diseases, the Eunice Kennedy Shriver National Institute of Child Health and Human Development, the National Institute of Neurological Disorders and Stroke, the National Heart, Lung, and Blood Institute, the National Institute of Arthritis and Musculoskeletal and Skin Diseases, the National Institute of Diabetes and Digestive and Kidney Diseases, the National Institute of Dental and Craniofacial Research, the National Institute of Mental Health and the Office of Dietary Supplements.

Rare Diseases Clinical Research Consortia 
In its fourth funding cycle, the Rare Diseases Clinical Research Network (RDCRN) consists of 20 Rare Diseases Clinical Research Consortia (RDCRCs) and a Data Management and Coordinating Center (DMCC).

The RDCRCs, the DMCC, and their Principal Investigators are located at the following institutions:

 Brain Vascular Malformation Consortium (BVMC), Helen Kim, M.P.H., Ph.D., University of California San Francisco, San Francisco, CA.
Brittle Bone Disorders Consortium (BBD), Brendan Lee, M.D., Ph.D., Baylor College of Medicine, Houston, TX.
Clinical Research in Amyotrophic Lateral Sclerosis and Related Disorders for Therapeutic Development (CReATe), Michael Benatar, M.D., Ph.D., University of Miami Miller School of Medicine, Miami, FL. 
Congenital and Perinatal Infections Consortium (CPIC), David Kimberlin, M.D., University of Alabama at Birmingham, Birmingham, AL.
Consortium of Eosinophilic Gastrointestinal Disease Researchers (CEGIR), Marc E. Rothenberg, M.D., Ph.D., Cincinnati Children's Hospital Medical Center, Cincinnati, OH.
Developmental Synaptopathies Consortium (DSC), Mustafa Sahin, M.D., Ph.D., Boston Children's Hospital, Boston, MA.
Dystonia Coalition (DC), Hyder A. Jinnah, M.D., Ph.D., Emory University, Atlanta, GA.
Frontiers in Congenital Disorders of Glycosylation Consortium (FCDGC), Eva Morava-Kozicz, M.D., Ph.D., Mayo Clinic, Rochester, NY.
Genetic Disorders of Mucociliary Clearance Consortium (GDMC), Stephanie Davis, M.D., The University of North Carolina at Chapel Hill and Thomas Ferkol, M.D., Washington University in St. Louis.
Global Leukodystrophy Initiative Clinical Trials Network (GLIA-CTN), Adeline L. Vanderver, M.D., Children's Hospital of Philadelphia; S. Ali Fatemi, M.D., M.B.A., Kennedy Krieger Institute; and Florian S. Eichler, M.D., Massachusetts General Hospital. 
Inherited Neuropathies Consortium (INC), Michael E. Shy, M.D., University of Iowa, Iowa City.
Lysosomal Disease Network (LDN), Chester B. Whitley, M.D., Ph.D., University of Minnesota, Minneapolis, MN.
Myasthenia Gravis Rare Disease Network (MGNet). Henry J. Kaminski, M.D., George Washington University, Washington, DC.
Nephrotic Syndrome Network (NEPTUNE), Matthias Kretzler, M.D., University of Michigan, Ann Arbor, MI.
North American Mitochondrial Disease Consortium (NAMDC), Michio Hirano, M.D., Columbia University, New York, NY.
Phenylalanine Families and Researchers Exploring Evidence (PHEFREE), Cary Harding, M.D., Oregon Health & Science University, Portland, OR.
Porphyrias Consortium (PC), Robert J. Desnick, Ph.D., M.D., Icahn School of Medicine at Mount Sinai, New York, NY. 
Primary Immune Deficiency Treatment Consortium (PIDTC), Jennifer M. Puck, M.D., University of California San Francisco and Donald B. Kohn, M.D., University of California Los Angeles.
Urea Cycle Disorders Consortium (UCDC), Andrea L. Gropman, M.D., FAAP, FACMG, Children's National Medical Center, Washington, DC. 
Vasculitis Clinical Research Consortium (VCRC), Peter A. Merkel, M.D., M.P.H., University of Pennsylvania, Philadelphia, PA.
 Data Management and Coordinating Center (DMCC), Eileen King, Ph.D., Maurizio Macaluso, M.D., Ph.D., and Michael Wagner, Ph.D., Cincinnati Children's Hospital Medical Center, Cincinnati, OH.

The RDCRN’s Data Management and Coordinating Center (DMCC) is hosted by Cincinnati Children's Hospital Medical Center in Cincinnati, OH.  The DMCC manages shared resources and data from the RDCRN research studies. The DMCC emphasizes the standardization of data, increased data sharing and broad dissemination of research findings."

RDCRN Contact Registry 
The RDCRN Contact Registry is a patient contact registry sponsored by the National Institutes of Health (NIH). The RDCRN Contact Registry collects and stores the contact information of people who want to participate in RDCRN-sponsored research or learn more about RDCRN research. It connects patients with researchers in order to advance rare diseases research. Future research may produce helpful information for those with rare diseases.

References

External links 
Rare Diseases Clinical Research Network (RDCRN)
NIH Office of Rare Diseases Research (ORDR)
RDCRN Contact Registry

National Institutes of Health
Rare diseases